Guibare is a town in the Guibare Department of Bam Province in northern-central Burkina Faso. It is the capital of the Guibare Department and has a population of 2,836.

References

External links
Satellite map at Maplandia.com

Populated places in the Centre-Nord Region
Bam Province